Genesis HealthCare is a provider of short-term post-acute, rehabilitation, skilled nursing and long-term care services. As of January 2017, Genesis operates approximately 500 skilled nursing centers and assisted/senior living residences in 34 states across the United States. Genesis also supplies rehabilitation therapy to approximately 1,700 healthcare providers in 45 states and the District of Columbia. Genesis has approximately 80,000 employees. Genesis HealthCare is headquartered in Kennett Square, Pennsylvania.

History

20th century
Genesis Health Ventures was founded by Michael R. Walker and Richard R. Howard in 1985, with the acquisition of nine centers. Between 1985 and 1998, Genesis Health Ventures grew from a $32 million to a $2.4 billion public company through the acquisition of nursing homes and services, including rehabilitation therapy, diagnostic testing, respiratory therapy, and pharmacy companies.

In 1999, the federal government made cuts to Medicare, which at that time funded the majority of care for patients admitted to Genesis Centers from hospitals.

21st century
Genesis Health Ventures filed for Chapter 11 bankruptcy the following year, in 2000. In 2001, the company reorganized and reemerged from bankruptcy.

In 2003, Genesis Health Ventures separated the company's in-patient care and pharmacy divisions. As part of the separation, Genesis Health Ventures adopted NeighborCare pharmacy division's trade name, and spun off the company's Genesis ElderCare Skilled Nursing Centers and Assisted Living and Independent Living Communities, as well as Genesis Rehabilitation Therapy Services, into a new entity – Genesis HealthCare Corporation.

NeighborCare, which traded on NASDAQ as NCRX, was acquired by Omnicare in 2005.

On July 13, 2007, Formation Capital and JER Partners completed the acquisition of Genesis HealthCare Corporation. The total enterprise value of the transaction was approximately $2.0 billion. Genesis' shareholders received $69.35 in cash for each share of Genesis' common stock that they held.

On April 1, 2011, Health Care REIT, Inc., now Welltower, completed a $2.4 billion acquisition of substantially all of the real estate assets of privately-owned Genesis HealthCare, which was previously announced on February 28, 2011. In June 2012, Genesis HealthCare announced plans to acquire Sun Healthcare Group.

On December 1, 2012, Genesis completed the acquisition of Sun Healthcare Group, Inc. (NASDAQ GS: SUNH), which was headquartered in Irvine, California and operated skilled nursing facilities, assisted and independent living centers, and behavior health centers in 23 states. Sun also owned SunDance Rehabilitation, CareerStaff Unlimited and SolAmor Hospice.  Genesis acquired Sun for $8.50 per share.  The aggregate amount of the merger was approximately $215, excluding closing costs and the repayment of Sun debts.

On February 2, 2015, Genesis Healthcare merged with California-based Skilled Healthcare Group, Inc. The combined company operated more than 400 skilled nursing and assisted and senior living communities in 34 states and more than 1,800 rehabilitation therapy sites in 47 states. It reported over 90,000 employees with combined revenue of $5.5 billion. The company changed its ticker from (NYSE: SKH) to (NYSE: GEN).

In June 2015, Genesis HealthCare acquired 24 skilled nursing facilities from Revera.

Locations 
Genesis operates approximately 450 Skilled Nursing Facilities and Assisted/Senior Living Communities across the nation located in 30 states. Additionally, Genesis Rehab Services provide therapy to approximately 1,700 locations across 45 states.

References

External links

Formation Capital website

Health care companies based in Pennsylvania
American companies established in 1985
Companies based in Chester County, Pennsylvania
1985 establishments in Pennsylvania
Companies listed on the New York Stock Exchange
2007 mergers and acquisitions
Medical outsourcing companies of the United States